The Jacob Wise Neighbor House is a historic house built  and located at 143 West Mill Road near Long Valley in Washington Township, Morris County, New Jersey. The J. W. Neighbor House was added to the National Register of Historic Places on February 22, 1991, for its significance in architecture. The  property overlooks the valley formed by the South Branch Raritan River. It is now the Neighbour House Bed & Breakfast.

History
Leonard Neighbor (1698–1766), born Leanhart Nachbar, was a Moravian settler who moved here in 1738. His great-grandson, Jacob Wise (J. W.) Neighbor (1805–1889) purchased this subdivision in 1830 and likely built the house soon after. Jacob's brother, Leonard Neighbor (1802–1880), owned the nearby Leonard Neighbor Farmstead, also listed on the NRHP.

Description
The house is a two-story frame house, nearly square is shape, and built with Greek Revival style. It has a low hip roof. The front facade features a one-story porch spanning the length of the building.

See also
 National Register of Historic Places listings in Morris County, New Jersey
 German Valley Historic District

References

Further reading

External links
 

Washington Township, Morris County, New Jersey
National Register of Historic Places in Morris County, New Jersey
Houses on the National Register of Historic Places in New Jersey
New Jersey Register of Historic Places
Houses in Morris County, New Jersey
Greek Revival houses in New Jersey
Houses completed in 1830